Talavera de la Reina is a city and municipality of Spain, part of the autonomous community of Castile–La Mancha. Its population of 83,303 makes it the second most populated municipality of the province of Toledo and the fourth largest in the region.

Although the city straddles both banks of the Tagus, few kilometres downstream  from the junction of the former with the Alberche, most of the urbanisation concentrates on the right (northern) bank. There are two islands in the center of the city called Isla Grande and Chamelo Island. Three bridges cross the Tagus in Talavera.

The city is well known by its pottery craft. The Talavera de la Reina pottery was declared intangible cultural heritage by the UNESCO in 2019.

Toponymy
There are remnants of prehistoric cultures in the area. The village was founded by the Celts as a ford of the Tagus. The first mention of the city (with the name Aebura) occurs in Livy's  description of a battle between the Romans and the Carpetanoi, a Celtiberian tribe.  After the Roman conquest of Hispania, it was known as Caesarobriga, one of many Celtic toponyms preserved in Roman Hispania, with a name connoting "fortified" that was extended to many non-fortified towns: "Caesarburg". Caesarobriga served as an important center for agriculture and ceramics in the 3rd and 4th centuries BCE  During the Visigothic period, Talavera reverted to a variant of its Celtiberian name: Elbora or Ebora.  Its modern name is derived from Talabayra, the Muslim rendering of this Visigothic name.  The city was conquered by Muslim forces in 713 and conquered by Christian forces under Alfonso VI of Castile in 1083.

History

Foundation

Talavera de la Reina was founded at the confluence of the rivers Alberche and Tagus. This area of great ecological wealth was the settlement of Celtic people who built the most ancient ruins of the area.

Roman Empire and Visigothic Age
During the time of the Roman Empire the name of the city was Caesarobriga. In 182 BCE Quintus Fulvius Flaccus conquered the city, establishing it as part of the Roman province of Lusitania as a city that would pay a stipend, and as the capital of an extended area included in the legal convent of the city of Emerita Augusta. The leader Viriato, in his war against the Romans, lived in this territory between 145 and 139 BCE.  In this period Talavera de la Reina was a rich city with cattle markets and commercial exchange. Christianity came early to the city, and with the fall of the Western Roman Empire the Visigoths established in the city. Talavera was known then as (Aküis) or (Aibura). In the year 602, King Liuva II made a present to the city: the sculpture of the Virgin Mary, who was from then to the present day the symbol of the Christians in Talavera de la Reina, and the substitute for the goddess Ceres. In honour of the goddess Ceres, Talaverian Romans celebrated the spring festival called Mondas, which is still celebrated for the Virgin Mary.

Middle ages

The Muslims conquered Talavera in 712. They built new walls and a castle in Talavera. They also brought the use of fountains, water mills and new products brought from Africa and Asia. The fertile soil produced quality vegetables, fruits and grass for animal feed. The markets gained new strength, and the population, a mixture of Christians, Muslims and Jews, lived in harmony for some centuries.  Medina Al Talavayra took part in different wars between the kingdoms of Spain, becoming allied with Córdoba and Badajoz. Alfonso VI of León-Castile seized the city in 1083. The city was retaken temporarily by Muslims in 1109.

12th-century geographer Al-Idrisi reflects on Talavera describing it as a "large town by the riverside of the Tagus", "with a great number of watermills" and "surrounded of fertile fields".

The countryside of Talavera endured Almohad algaras in the early 1170s. Violence resumed after a truce in 1177, as answer to the simultaneous Castilian siege on Cuenca. In 1182, an Almohad army set up a camp near Talavera. Following the Almohad victory at Alarcos by Abu Yusuf Yaqub in 1195, Almohad forces ravaged the countryside of Talavera by 1197, yet apparently the well-fortified city (at least the citadel) stood still. Following the battle of Las Navas in 1212, the territory north of the Montes de Toledo became secure from Muslim incursions for good. Talaveran militias reportedly launched unsuccessful raids in Southern Iberia for the remaining of the 13th century.

The repopulation of the territory after the Christian conquest was led by Castilians, Franks and Mozarabs. Also a number of Moors from the south would increase the preexisting Muslim population of Talavera. Until 1290, Castilians and Mozarabs lived under the aegis of different law regimes. By the mid 13th century, Talavera and Plasencia sealed the creation of a brotherhood seeking to counter the territorial push southwards of the powerful concejo of Ávila.

Formerly a  town, sometimes property of queens, such as Maria of Portugal, Talavera was transferred by Henry II of Castile on 25 June 1369 to Gómez Manrique (the transfer was confirmed in the 1371 Cortes of Toro), the Archbishop of Toledo, as payment for the latter's support in the Castilian Civil War, and, since then, the town became attached to the Archbishops of Toledo.

The change from the concejo abierto towards a regimiento system of municipal government in Talavera should have happened by the second half of the 14th century. Unlike other locations the chief municipal public offices (regidurías) in Talavera were not subject to transfer from father to son, so the nobiliary elite relied in an alternative strategy to ensure its supremacy, based on a system that allowed them to control the candidates to the regidoría.

King Sancho IV gave the royal privilege to hold two royal markets each year.

Early Modern history

By the late third of the 16th century the city reached a population of 10,000.

Upon the death of King Charles II in November 1700, two powerful nations fought for the Spanish Crown. Talavera supported Philip V's French faction, which was the winner.

In the mid-18th century, by 1748, as part of the economic policies enforced by the Spanish Bourbons, the Royal Factory of Silk, Silver and Gold Fabric, was opened in the city, during the reign of Ferdinand VI.

The number of hidalgos reduced during the 18th century. The clergy retained an important socioeconomic importance. Towards the end of the century, a number of religious French emigrees would arrive to Talavera after the triumph of the Revolution. During the second half of the century, the bulk of the working population comprised the non-specialised workers and textile workers, ceramics workers (with a diminishing importance compared to previous centuries) and those dedicated to services, followed by the food industry, leather and the shoemaking sector.

19th and 20th centuries
The Peninsular War had great consequences for Talavera. On 27 and 28 July 1809 the Battle of Talavera took place between the Anglo-Spanish army and the French. The Duke of Wellington's army expelled the French from the city.

The manufacturing complex of the Royal Silk Factory closed towards 1851.

Talavera was granted the title of city (ciudad) in 1876.

A number of public events and demonstrations took place as part of the legitimization of the regime. The good connections of Mayor Justiniano López Brea with provincial and national officeholders fostered several projects of public works in the later part of the dictatorial period.

The railroad brought new opportunities for improvement. Talavera changed its name to Talavera del Tajo. The city had a population of 16,654 in 1936. The city had a population of 18,631 in 1940.

During the Francoist dictatorship the Instituto Nacional de Colonización promoted a large irrigated zone in the surroundings of Talavera, following which two new settlements were created, called Talavera la Nueva and Alberche del Caudillo, the latter located in the neighboring Calera y Chozas municipality. During the 1960s a baby boom caused an increase in the population, added to by the immigrants coming from the nearby villages and poor areas of Extremadura.

Recent developments

In 1975 Franco died, and democracy came to Spain. Talavera's first democratic mayor tried to create the province of Talavera, but the idea was not successful. The next mayor, Pablo Tello from the Socialist Party, made large projects such as the Alameda Park.

In 1989 a feeling of marginalization enveloped the city, and a group of people called "Nosotros Talavera" (we Talavera) started fighting for the creation of a University Campus and other projects for the city.

A Center for University Studies was opened in the city in 1994; it fully integrated as campus of the University of Castile-La Mancha (UCLM) four years later, in 1998.

Main sights 
Given the enormous cost and limited use, it is considered a wasteful investment. Spanning over 318 m over the main channel of the Tagus, the cable-stayed bridge it is nonetheless one of the city's most distinctive features.

Geography

Climate

Culture

Pottery

The city is internationally known for its ceramics, which Philip II of Spain used as tiled revetments in many of his works, such as the monastery of El Escorial. The nickname of Talavera de la Reina is 'The City of Pottery' (La Ciudad de la Cerámica, in Spanish). Mexico's famous Talavera pottery was named after the city.

Transportation

The city is located at the intersection of Autovía A-5 (part of European route E90) and N-502. Located on the route between Madrid and Badajoz, it has a railway station. Talavera de la Reina's city bus system is Eborabus.

International relations
Twin cities—Sister towns
Talavera de la Reina is twinned with:

 Bron, France.
 Faenza, Italy.
 Santiago del Estero, Argentina
 Puebla, Mexico
 Plasencia, Spain
 Daira of Guelta, Western Sahara
 Talavera de la Reyna, Peru

Other partnerships
 Radom, Poland, since 2006

See also 
 El Casar de Talavera

References
References

Bibliography

External links

 Official website  
  Talavera, official tourist web site 
 Web oficial del Ayuntamiento de Talavera de la Reina
 La Guia de Talavera de la Reina
 Web oficial Turismo Talavera de la Reina
 El Portal de Talavera de la Reina
 Talavera se mueve

 
Municipalities in the Province of Toledo
Populated places established in the 1st millennium BC